Collegedale Municipal Airport  is a city-owned, public-use airport located two nautical miles (4 km) southeast of the central business district of the Collegedale, a city in Hamilton County, Tennessee, United States.

Collegedale Municipal is one of the busiest general aviation airports in the state of Tennessee with an average of 120 aircraft stationed there. It won the Tennessee Aeronautics Commission's "Airport of the Year" award in 2003. The airport does not provide scheduled commercial service. However, charter service is provided by Aviation Specialists, Inc., a private company located at the airport, that offers flight instruction and a banner towing operation.

This airport is assigned a three-letter location identifier of FGU by the Federal Aviation Administration, but it does not have an International Air Transport Association (IATA) airport code (the IATA assigned FGU to Fangatau Airport in French Polynesia).

History
Begun as a flying club in 1965 by pilot and mechanic John Linn and Ellsworth McKee—son of the founders of the McKee Foods Corporation, the Collegedale Airport was originally a  grass strip on a farm. It was purchased by pilot-entrepreneur Aubrey Kinzer in 1969 and turned into a commercial venture with a flight school, rental aircraft, and aircraft maintenance. In 1972, the City of Collegedale obtained the property, and over the years the asphalt paved runway has been extended to 4,700 feet (1400 m) from its nominal 3,500-foot (1150 m) length and widened to 75 feet (23 m) with a parallel taxiway. In 1995, the airport was rededicated and renamed Linn Field in honor of John Linn. Renovations and additions to the terminal, lobby, and Fixed-Base Operations (FBO) office were completed in 2003.

Facilities and aircraft 
Collegedale Municipal Airport covers an area of 145 acres (59 ha) at an elevation of 860 feet (262 m) above mean sea level. It has one runway designated 3/21 with an asphalt surface measuring 5,003 by 75 feet (1,525 x 23 m).

For the 12-month period ending September 30, 2011, the airport had 14,500 aircraft operations, an average of 39 per day: 97% general aviation and 3% air taxi. At that time there were 101 aircraft based at this airport: 92% single-engine, 4% multi-engine, 2% helicopter, and 2% ultralight.

The airport offers rental and maintenance services and is open every day from 8:30 a.m. until 5:30 p.m, except for Thanks Giving, Christmas, a half day on Christmas Eve, and New Years Day.

Nearby airports with instrument approach procedures include:
 CHA – Lovell Field 9 nautical miles (17 km) W
 HDI – Hardwick Field 14 nautical miles (26 km) NE
 DNN – Dalton Municipal Airport 21 nautical miles (39 km) S
 9A5 – Barwick-LaFayette Airport 25 nautical miles (46 km) SW
 2A0 – Mark Anton Airport 27 nautical miles (50 km) N

References

External links 
 Collegedale Municipal Airport page at City of Collegedale website
 Collegedale Municipal Airport page at Tennessee DOT Airport Directory
 Aerial image as of March 1997 from USGS The National Map via MSR Maps
 

Airports in Tennessee
Buildings and structures in Hamilton County, Tennessee
Transportation in Hamilton County, Tennessee
1965 establishments in Tennessee
Airports established in 1965